Alarsky District (Alairai aimag) is an administrative district of Ust-Orda Buryat Okrug of Irkutsk Oblast, Russia, one of the thirty-three in the oblast. Municipally, it is incorporated as Alarsky Municipal District. It is located in the south of the oblast. Its administrative center is the rural locality (a settlement) of Kutulik. As of the 2010 Census, the total population of the district was 21,479, with the population of Kutulik accounting for 22.7% of that number.

References

Notes

Sources

Registry of the Administrative-Territorial Formations of Irkutsk Oblast 

Districts of Irkutsk Oblast